The Darlington trolleybus system once served the town of Darlington, County Durham, England.

By the standards of the various now-defunct trolleybus systems in the United Kingdom, the Darlington system was a moderately sized one, with a total of 5 routes, and a maximum fleet of 66 trolleybuses.

None of the former Darlington trolleybuses are recorded as having been preserved.

See also

Transport in Darlington
List of trolleybus systems in the United Kingdom

References

Notes

Further reading

External links
National Trolleybus Archive
British Trolleybus Society, based in Reading
National Trolleybus Association, based in London

Transport in Darlington
Darlington
Darlington